Carlos Eduardo de Andrade  (born 8 June 1968), known professionally as Eduardo Moscovis, is a Brazilian actor.

Selected filmography
 Pedra sobre Pedra (1992)
 Mulheres de Areia (1993)
 As Pupilas do Senhor Reitor (1994)
 Por Amor (1997)
 Pecado Capital (1998)
 O Cravo e a Rosa (2000)
 Desejos de Mulher (2002)
 Kubanacan (2003)
 Senhora do Destino (2004)
 Alma Gêmea (2005)
 Amor em Sampa (2013)
 A Regra do Jogo (2015)
 O Sétimo Guardião (2018)
 O Doutrinador (2018)
 O Doutrinador: A Série (2019)
 Bom Dia, Verônica (2020)
 El Presidente: The Corruption Game (2022)

References

External links

1968 births
Living people
Brazilian male telenovela actors
Brazilian male stage actors
Male actors from Rio de Janeiro (city)